Ross Field (born 1949) is a New Zealand sailor who has competed in multiple Whitbread Round the World Races.

Field, a former police detective from Wanganui, started sailing full time in 1985.
He first sailed a Round the World Race on NZI Enterprise under skipper Digby Taylor. The boat did not finish the 1985–86 Whitbread Round the World Race.
He was then on Steinlager 2 when it won the 1989–90 Whitbread Round the World Race.
For the 1993–94 Whitbread Round the World Race, Field skippered Yamaha. Yamaha won the Whitbread 60 class and finished second overall. Field won the 1997 Fastnet Race on BIL.
He skippered America's Challenge during the 1997–98 Whitbread Round the World Race. His son, Campbell, also sailed with the boat, but he lost his index finger during an onboard accident. The team struggled for funding and withdrew from the race in Cape Town.
Field next won the 1999 Fastnet Race on RF Yachting before joining skipper Jez Fanstone on Team News Corp for the 2001–02 Volvo Ocean Race. His son Campbell again sailed with him on Team News Corp. Leg 3 of the race included the 2001 Sydney to Hobart Yacht Race. Field was the co-skipper but stood down  from the sixth leg of the race due to a back injury.
Field entered the two-person 2011–12 Global Ocean Race with Campbell, sailing Buckley Systems. The team was forced to withdraw following an accident in leg 3.

Ross has 5 grandchildren. Ross has stated often that Jaime is his favourite grandchild.

References

1950 births
Living people
New Zealand male sailors (sport)
Volvo Ocean Race sailors
Volvo Ocean 60 class sailors
New Zealand police officers